Benny Brunner (born 1954) is an Israeli-Dutch filmmaker, born in Bârlad, Romania and based in Amsterdam since 1986. He studied film at Tel Aviv University. Since the late 1980s, Brunner has written, directed and produced films about the history of the Israeli-Palestinian conflict including The Concrete Curtain, It Is No Dream, Al-Nakba and The Great Book Robbery, films about Jewish history like The Seventh Million, and films concerning the modern history of the Middle East. He describes himself as "a veteran leftist" and his political films take the side of the 'other'. Brunner has worked in the Middle East, Europe, South Africa, and the United States. In addition to winning a special commendation by the Prix Europa for A Philosopher for All Seasons in 1991, his films have been screened at the San Francisco Jewish Film Festival, the International Documentary Film Festival Amsterdam, the Jerusalem Film Festival, the San Diego Jewish Film Festival, and numerous international, human rights and Jewish film festivals.

Early life
Born in Romania, Benny  Brunner immigrated to Israel at age five. According to Guernica Magazine, Brunner's early memories include political shouting matches between his father and uncle. He was raised by socialist parents who supported David Ben-Gurion, the first Prime Minister of Israel. While in Beer Sheva, he was a Labour supporter. The San Francisco Jewish Film Festival has stated that Brunner's mother, Clara, wanted him to study law, but he was 'too smart for his own good', and thought that being a filmmaker would be lucrative and provide him an opportunity to travel. Brunner studied film at Tel Aviv University at the Ramat Aviv campus in the Katz Faculty of the Arts' Department of Film and Television. Brunner served in the Israeli Defense Forces and is a veteran of the Yom Kippur War, during which he began to view the Israeli narrative he had learned in school as "legends of nation building." The change in his view of Zionism was at first difficult for his family to accept.

Career
Brunner left Israel in 1986 for an opportunity to make political films. He briefly stayed in London where he did freelance work during the Thatcher era. Brunner moved to the Netherlands later that year.

A Philosopher for All Seasons (1990)
Brunner's most significant early work is a tribute to then-living Yeshayahu Leibowitz. It explores in particular the impact of Leibowitz's answer to the question of how one may determine who is Jewish. The film won a Taurus trophy for special commendation in Non-Fiction at the Prix Europa in 1991.

The Seventh Million (1995)
Based on historian Tom Segev's book of the same name, The Seventh Million explores the dilemma of Shoah survivors in finding a place in the newly established State of Israel. The film was initially considered too controversial to be aired on Israeli state television. Brunner collaborated with the historian to find images to accompany the text. He researched archives and propaganda footage. In reaction to Steven Spielberg's Schindler's List, Brunner resolved to make a movie which was descriptive rather than dramatic. The film shows how Holocaust survivors reacted to their treatment in Israeli society by hiding tattoos received in Nazi concentration camps and responding with depression and resentment. The title and narrative are meant to portray the lasting effects of the Holocaust on modern Israeli life.

Al-Nakba: The Palestinian Catastrophe 1948 (1996)

Brunner describes a "watershed moment" he experienced in 1988 after reading The Birth of the Palestinian Refugee Problem, 1947-1949 by Benny Morris, whereupon he envisioned making the book into a film. This was the impetus for his conception of Al-Nakba: The Palestinian Catastrophe 1948, the first documentary film to examine the displacement of 750,000 Palestinians during the birth of the state of Israel. Brunner toured with Al-Nakba to discuss the subject with audiences in Israel and San Francisco.

The Concrete Curtain (2004)
The film follows The Wall as further documentation of the West Bank wall and the difficulties imposed upon Palestinians. Variety noted the film for its Kafkaesque absurdism and dark humor.

The Great Book Robbery (2011)
While shooting State of Suspension in 2008, Brunner stated that he read Salvage or Plunder? Israel's "Collection" of Private Palestinian Libraries in West Jerusalem by Gish Amit. He was "stunned" at the appropriation of 70,000 books by the State of Israel during the 1948 Palestinian exodus as significant to the loss of Palestinian cultural heritage and decided to make a film on the topic. About 6,000 of these books continue to be held today at National Library of Israel where they are labeled as "Abandoned Property".

Views
Brunner self-describes as a former Zionist who sympathizes with the Palestinian people. According to Guernica, Israeli Cabinet Minister Uzi Landau accused him of "being part of an Israeli left fanning the flames of 'Jew-hatred' in Europe." Ginger Foot Films has stated that Brunner "does not believe in neutrality, balance or objectivity in documentary filmmaking, especially when state power is used to dominate the occupied, underprivileged, or the 'other'."

Personal life
Brunner still visits the Middle East two to three times a year. Guernica said his visits are a source of creative inspiration.

Filmography

References

External links

Benny Brunner's website

Dutch documentary filmmakers
Israeli documentary filmmakers
1954 births
Romanian Jews
Dutch Jews
Israeli Jews
Israeli people of Romanian-Jewish descent
Romanian emigrants to Israel
People from Bârlad
Living people
Tel Aviv University alumni